Chaerilus philippinus is a species of scorpion native to the Philippines.

Description 
Adult C. philippinus range from 15 mm to 19 mm in total length. Scorpions of this species may be reddish-yellow to  reddish-brown in color.

References 

Animals described in 2008
Chaerilidae
Scorpions of Asia